Opera (also known and released as Terror at the Opera) is a 1987 Italian giallo slasher film directed and co-written by Dario Argento and starring Cristina Marsillach, Urbano Barberini, Daria Nicolodi, and Ian Charleson. The film's plot focuses on a young soprano (Marsillach) who becomes involved in a series of murders being committed inside an opera house by a masked assailant. The film features music composed and performed by Brian Eno, Claudio Simonetti, and Bill Wyman.

Plot 

When Mara Cecova, the star of an avant-garde production of Verdi's Macbeth at the Parma Opera House, is injured after getting hit by a car outside the theater during an argument with the director, Cecova's young understudy, Betty, is given the role of Lady Macbeth. Despite her initial apprehension, Betty's performance proves a success. However, an anonymous figure finds his way into the opera house on the opening night, watching Betty's performance from an empty box. When a stagehand finds him, the figure murders him against a coat hook.

While at her boyfriend Stefano's apartment, the unseen assailant breaks in and overpowers Betty. He gags her with tape, ties her to a pillar, and forces her to watch him kill Stefano, taping a row of needles beneath her eyes to ensure she sees his death. Afterwards, the masked killer unties Betty and flees the apartment. Disturbed by a childhood recollection of the same killer murdering her own mother, Betty chooses not to go to the police and instead confides in her director, Marco, that the killer may know her.

The next day, Inspector Alan Santini questions the opera house staff about Stefano's murder, as well as an attack on the production's pet ravens, three of which were found dead after the show. Later that day, after Betty's costume is found slashed to ribbons, Betty meets with the wardrobe seamstress, Giulia. While repairing the dress, Giulia finds a gold bracelet with an anniversary date sewn onto it. The killer soon intervenes, again restraining Betty and taping needles under her eyes. He stabs Giulia, who swallows the bracelet, prompting him to cut her throat open to retrieve it. The assailant unties Betty and flees.

When Betty returns to her apartment, she comes across Santini, who promises to send Betty a detective to keep guard over her. A man identifying himself as Inspector Soavi arrives to look after her. Later, Betty's agent Mira arrives and tells Betty that she talked with a man in the lobby claiming to be Soavi. Unsure which is the impostor, Betty and Mira hide while the figure claiming to be Soavi receives a phone call and leaves. Mira answers a knock at the door and demands the visitor identify himself. As she looks through the peephole, she is fatally shot. After the killer breaks in and Betty comes across a mortally wounded Soavi, Betty escapes through a ventilation shaft with the help of a girl living in a neighbouring apartment.

Betty returns to the opera house and meets with Marco, who tells her he has a plan to identify the killer. The following night, Betty again takes the stage as Lady Macbeth. During the performance, Marco unleashes a flock of ravens into the audience. Recognizing the face of their attacker from the previous night, the birds swoop down on him, gouging out one of his eyes. The murderer, revealed to be Santini, attempts to shoot at Betty. Santini evades capture and abducts Betty from her dressing room, dragging her to another room.

Santini reveals that he was once the teenage lover of Betty's mother and murdered young women at her behest, but killed the mother due to her escalating demands; Betty witnessed the murder from behind a partly open door. Now, years later, Santini's desire to kill has been rekindled by Betty's appearance, which he sees as her mother's reincarnation. Blindfolding Betty and tying her to a chair, Santini stages his own death by setting fire to the room and apparently himself. Betty breaks free and escapes.

Betty and Marco leave Rome, traveling to Marco's house in the Swiss Alps. However, when Marco hears a television broadcast that the man thought to have been burned alive was not Santini but a clothed mannequin, he yells for Betty to flee. Betty runs into the nearby woods, with Santini in pursuit. Marco tackles him, only to be stabbed to death. Betty distracts Santini long enough to bash him on the head with a rock, after which the police arrive to take him away. Betty wanders through an empty meadow. Finding a lizard trapped in the grass, Betty frees it and tells it to "go free."

Cast 
 Cristina Marsillach as Betty
 Ian Charleson as Marco
 Urbano Barberini as Inspector Alan Santini
 Daria Nicolodi as Mira
 Coralina Cataldi-Tassoni as Giulia
 Antonella Vitale as Marion
 William McNamara as Stefano
 Barbara Cupisti as Signora Albertini
 Michele Soavi as Inspector Daniele Soavi (uncredited)

Production 

Dario Argento based the movie on his experiences directing a failed production of Giuseppe Verdi's Macbeth, with Ian Charleson's character of Marco being based on Argento himself. The plot device of needles taped under the eye (an image featured prominently in the film's promotional campaign), came from a joke of Argento's. The director said it would annoy him when people would look away during the scary scenes in his films, and jokingly suggested taping pins under people's eyes so they couldn't look away from the film. The role of Signora Mara Cecova was written with Vanessa Redgrave in mind. When she proved to be unavailable, the character's scenes were greatly reduced.

Actress Daria Nicolodi originally did not want to play the role of Mira, having recently ended her long-time relationship with Argento. What finally convinced her to take the role was the character's elaborate and shocking death scene. She would later say that filming her death scene was tremendously frightening as it required her to have a small amount of explosive placed on the back of her head. The role of Inspector Daniele Soavi was played by the character's namesake, Argento's long-time collaborator Michele Soavi, in an uncredited role. This was the final film of actor Ian Charleson, who tested positive for HIV after a minor car accident, something which he had suspected for several months. He died three years after the film's release.

The film was picked up for a planned 1989 US release by Orion Pictures and prepared as a 95 min R-rated edit (Terror at the Opera), which had eleven minutes removed, mainly the epilogue set in the Swiss Alps and Betty's final confrontation with the murderer. However, due to Orion's growing financial issues and Argento's refusal to allow the epilogue to be omitted, the film was never released theatrically and only made available in the US as a VHS release from Southgate Entertainment. Southgate offered Terror at the Opera in an R-rated version for Blockbuster Video and an "unrated" version that was the first truly uncut video release worldwide. In the United Kingdom, where the unedited version was submitted to the BBFC for release in 1990, the censors ordered 47 seconds of violence removed, including shots of throats being cut with knives and scissors. These were restored in the 2002 DVD release. During a promotional screening at the Cannes Film Festival, several audience members criticized the poor quality of actor Urbano Barberini's voice. As such, his lines were re-dubbed prior to the film's English-language release.

The eponymous opera house is the Teatro Regio in Parma, Italy, one of the film's primary filming locations.

Soundtrack

Critical reception 
On the review aggregator website Rotten Tomatoes, Opera has an approval rating of 91% based on 22 reviews, with an average rating of 7.07/10. The site's critical consensus reads: "The Opera house location gives plenty to work with for director Dario Argento, who hits his decadently bloody high notes here." Ed Gonzalez of Slant Magazine awarded the film a score of four out of four stars, calling it Argento's "last full-fledged masterpiece" and praising the "operatic attention to death and the way in which the film's killer forces Betty's gaze" as "genius".

Brian Orndorf of Blu-ray.com gave the film a grade of "B", writing that while "[it] isn't a tightly wound effort, perhaps a bit too easily distracted at times, [...] there's energy in the essentials, watching a black-gloved killer stalk his victims, finding strange ways to take lives." Patrick Legare of AllMovie awarded the film two-and-a-half out of five stars, calling it "a decent, fairly typical Argento film that is worth watching primarily for its above-average murder sequences."

References

External links 
 
 

1987 films
1987 horror films
1980s psychological thriller films
Italian horror films
1980s Italian-language films
Films directed by Dario Argento
Giallo films
Films scored by Claudio Simonetti
Films about opera
Italian serial killer films
Films set in Emilia-Romagna
Films shot in Switzerland
Orion Pictures films
The Phantom of the Opera
Films with screenplays by Dario Argento
Films shot in Italy
Italian exploitation films
1980s Italian films